The Gate of Truth can refer to:

Gate of Alchemy from the anime Fullmetal Alchemist
The Gate of Truth in Hades, from Virgil's Aeneid